The Lake Charles Land Sharks were an indoor football team.  They were a charter member of the National Indoor Football League (NIFL). They played their home games at the Sudduth Coliseum in Lake Charles, Louisiana.  Despite having pretty good success throughout their existence, the team folded after the 2004 season and were replaced by the Louisiana Swashbucklers.

Season-by-Season 

|-
|2001 || 7 || 3 || 0 || 2nd South || Lost Round 1 (Ohio Valley) 
|-
|2002 || 13 || 2 || 0 || 1st Atlantic South || Lost Round 1 (T. ThunderCats)
|-
|2003 || 13 || 3 || 0 || 1st Atlantic South || Won Round 1 (Houma Bayou Bucks)Lost AC Championship (Ohio Valley)
|-
|2004 || 7 || 7 || 0 || 4th Atlantic South || --
|-
!Totals || 41 || 18 || 0
|colspan="2"| (including playoffs)

External links
 L.C. Land Sharks' 2001 Stats
 L.C. Land Sharks' 2002 Stats
 L.C. Land Sharks' 2003 Stats
 L.C. Land Sharks' 2004 Stats

American football teams in Louisiana
National Indoor Football League teams
Land Sharks
American football teams established in 2000
American football teams disestablished in 2004
2000 establishments in Louisiana
2004 disestablishments in Louisiana